Ek Jhoota Lafz Mohabbat is a 2021 Pakistani drama serial aired on Express Entertainment. The drama stars Junaid Khan, Amna Ilyas and Aiza Awan in lead roles. The drama was first aired on 10 August 2021.

Cast
Amna Ilyas as Aleeza
Junaid Khan as Maaz
Aiza Awan as Arresha
Emmad Irfani as Hassan
Sajid Hassan as Nasir
Adnan Jaffar
Hassan Niazi
Shagufta Ejaz
Mehwish Qureshi
Saima Qureshi as Shazia
Usman Mazhar

References

2021 Pakistani television series debuts
2022 Pakistani television series endings
Pakistani drama television series
Urdu-language television shows